Hattenville is a commune in the Seine-Maritime department in the Normandy region in northern France.

The most famous reference to Hattenville is in Paul Cézanne's painting 'Farm in Normandy, Summer'. This was painted at the farm of one of Cézanne's friends, very near Hattenville.

Geography

Heraldry

Population

Places of interest
 The church of St-Pierre, dating from the eleventh century.
 A fourteenth-century stone cross.

See also
Communes of the Seine-Maritime department

References

External links

More information about the Cezanne painting

Communes of Seine-Maritime